Trần Nguyễn Uyên Linh (born December 31, 1987), better known as her stage name Uyên Linh, is a Vietnamese pop singer who won the third season of Vietnam Idol in 2010.

Biography
Uyen Linh was born in Ho Chi Minh City. After graduating from Le Hong Phong High School, she moved to Hanoi to study International Politics at the Diplomatic Academy of Vietnam. During her study there, she opened a small fashion shop near the school. It worked quite well. However, due to her busy schedule, the shop was subsequently closed. When in Hanoi, Uyen Linh also mastered the Northern accent, which is often considered standard in singing Vietnamese songs.

Uyen Linh's idol is Whitney Houston and her favorite genre is RnB. According to one of her interviews, she admires the voice of Whitney because "Whenever Linh hears her singing, Linh feels like unable to stray away from Whitney. Linh feels extremely focused on Whitney's graceful shape of the lips, body movement and emotions; especially those moments when she's sublimating on stage. It creates the wish inside that urges Linh to want to shine brightly like Whitney. So, for Linh, the title "Idol" carries a larger and more meaningful message than it appears, especially when Linh chose to be a singer. Linh thinks that one in a hundred of people who is chosen to be a singer and they need a strong source of support to continue the chosen path, whether it's right or wrong. For Linh, Whitney Houston represents that source."

In 2008, she auditioned for the second season of Vietnam Idol and the third series of Sao Mai – Điểm hẹn prior to re-auditioning for Vietnam Idol (season 3), but failed to make it through. She received special prizes from 2008 Soul of Melody, 2008 Let's Get Loud contest. She was a finalist of Northern region in pop genre of Sao Mai 2009 but she did not make it to the National.

Vietnam Idol (Season 3)
Uyen Linh auditioned for the third season of Vietnam Idol in Hanoi. She advanced to top 10 from the semi-final by the selection of the judges. Uyen Linh's performances were highly applauded by the judges throughout the contests. However, she was in the bottom three in the fifth gala round and was originally eliminated from the show but later was saved thanks to Đăng Khoa's withdrawal (one of the judges later confirmed that they would have saved her otherwise). From top three, she received many positive feedbacks from the judges, audiences, and the mass media with her successful performances.

Uyen Linh's Facebook page has attracted more than 110,000 fans as of January 10, 2011. However, it was disabled without any notice by Facebook. Uyen Linh confirmed that she had no knowledge of how and why her Facebook fan page was deleted; she only received a warning from Facebook regarding the spam issue and afterwards the page was disabled without any clear reason. A new Facebook page was established for her in August 2011.

Uyen Linh's auditions were uploaded to YouTube by her fans and have received huge number of views worldwide.

  Đăng Khoa withdrew from the contest; therefore, Uyên Linh was saved from elimination.

Post-Idol 
Uyen Linh appeared on "2010 Moments" year-end talkshow on K+, a cable channel of Vietnam Television and talked about her life after Vietnam Idol. She later was chosen as a Person of the Year 2010 by VTV. Early 2011, she released her debut single – Cảm Ơn Tình Yêu – her winning song from Vietnam Idol and received positive reception. She appeared on Duyên dáng Việt Nam 23 for two nights, performing a cover of Xích lô and another song with My Linh, Hương Lan and Phuong Vy.

Quickly after her victory, she was invited to several music shows and events. It was rumored that she required about $2000 or 40 million dong for 2–3 songs each performance. Uyên Linh neither denied nor confirmed this rumor and commented that "I lack experience in dealing with show hosters". Linh was chosen to be an opening act for David Archuleta concert in Ho Chi Minh city on June 22, 2011.

Uyen Linh's debut album was originally set to be released in May, however, the album release was pushed back to late June. As of October 1, 2011, the release date of her debut album is yet to be confirmed. On October 22, 2011, Linh's debut music video for the song Giấc mơ tôi had its premiere on MTV Vietnam. Linh's promotional single Người hát tình ca was awarded January's "Song of the Month" in a program called Favorite Song organized by VTV despite the fact that the studio version of the single was not released until the release of the album. Her debut album Giấc mơ tôi was open for pre-order two days before the official release, all copies in the first phase was sold out in one day. Her album was officially released on February 9, 2012.

Discography

Singles

Albums

Studio albums

Compilation albums

Music video
Giấc mơ tôi (2011)
Mượn (2012)
Nơi ấy có cha (2013)
Chờ người nơi ấy (2013)

Unreleased songs
If I Ain't Got You (Performed in Vietnam Idol audition)
Fallin' (Performed on Vietnam Idol)
Tell Him
Gió (Performed on Vietnam Idol)
Chìm Trong Muôn Thuở
Trả Nợ Tình Xa

References

1987 births
Living people
Vietnam Idol
Idols (TV series) winners
21st-century Vietnamese women singers
People from Ho Chi Minh City
People educated at Le Hong Phong High School